Franky Dekenne (born 7 July 1960) is a Belgian football midfielder and later manager.

References

External links
 

1960 births
Living people
Belgian footballers
K.S.V. Waregem players
Royal Antwerp F.C. players
K.V.C. Westerlo players
Belgian Pro League players
Challenger Pro League players
Belgium international footballers
Association football midfielders
Belgian football managers
K.V.C. Westerlo managers
K.V. Kortrijk managers
Sportkring Sint-Niklaas managers
K.M.S.K. Deinze managers
People from Waregem
Footballers from West Flanders